Reza Irfana (born 9 July 1999) is an Indonesian professional footballer who plays as a midfielder for Liga 1 club PSIS Semarang.

Club career

PSIS Semarang
He was signed for PSIS Semarang to play in Liga 1 in the 2021 season. Irfana made his league debut on 12 September 2021 in a match against Persija Jakarta at the Indomilk Arena, Tangerang.

Career statistics

Club

References

External links
 Reza Irfana at Soccerway

1999 births
Living people
Indonesian footballers
Liga 1 (Indonesia) players
Persipasi Bekasi players
Bali United F.C. players
PSIS Semarang players
Association football midfielders
People from Pati Regency
Sportspeople from Central Java